2PM Best ~2008–2011 in Korea~ is the second compilation album by South Korean boy band 2PM. It was released on March 14, 2012 in three editions: limited CD+DVD, limited CD with bonus tracks and a regular edition.

Background
The album was announced on 2PM's official Japanese website on January 18, 2012. On February 22, the track list of all editions was announced. CD Type B edition includes 2 bonus tracks: "Alive", sung by Jun.K, which is already released in South Korea as a digital single and "Move On", sung by Junho and Wooyoung.

Composition
The album contains all Korean singles of the group released from 2008 to 2011 and some tracks from their mini albums Hottest Time of the Day, 2:00PM Time for Change, Don't Stop Can't Stop, Still 2:00PM and from the studio albums 01:59PM and Hands Up.

Track listing

Charts

Oricon

Release history

References

External links 

 

2012 compilation albums
2PM albums
Korean-language albums
Ariola Records albums
Sony Music Entertainment Japan albums